Highland Mary is a Category B listed monument in Dunoon, Scotland, dedicated to Mary Campbell, the lover of Robert Burns.

The statue, unveiled on 21 July 1896, the centenary of Burns' death, and made of bronze, was sculpted by David Watson Stevenson. It stands, facing southeast, on a round ashlar pedestal with an octagonal cap and base. It is inscribed Burns Highland Mary.

A reduced size plaster copy of the statue is held in the Robert Burns Birthplace Museum in South Ayrshire.

See also
List of listed buildings in Dunoon

References

External links
Statue of "Highland Mary" - Historic Environment Scotland listing

Listed buildings in Dunoon
1896 sculptures
Category B listed buildings in Argyll and Bute
Listed monuments and memorials in Scotland
Outdoor sculptures in Scotland
Statues in Scotland
1896 establishments in Scotland
Bronze sculptures